Bangladesh has numerous public holidays, including national memorial, religious and  secular holidays of Bengali origin. The Bengali traditional calendar, known as Banggabda  is the national and official calendar in Bangladesh. The holidays are celebrated according to Bengali, Islamic or Gregorian calendars for religious and civil purposes, respectively. Religious festivals like Eid are celebrated according to the Islamic calendar whereas other national holidays are celebrated according to the Bengali and Gregorian calendar. While the Islamic calendar is based on the movement of the moon, it loses synchronization with the seasons, through seasonal drift. Therefore, some public holidays are subject to change every year based on the lunar calendar.

There are fifteen public holidays in Bangladesh. Muslims and non-Muslims have four religious holidays each in addition to the seven secular national holidays. For the Muslims, four major Islamic holidays:  Ashura, Mawlid, Eid ul-Fitr and Eid ul-Adha are observed. For the Hindus: Krishna Janmashtami and Durga Puja are celebrated. As for the Christians and Buddhists: Christmas and Vesak (one day each) are celebrated.

National holidays

Religious holidays

Islamic holidays

Hindu holidays

Christian holidays

Buddhist holidays

Partial holidays or national days

Festivals in Bangladesh
List of festivals in Bangladesh

References

 
Bangladesh
Holidays
Society of Bangladesh
Holidays